Antonio Marziali is an Italian para-alpine skier.

He represented Italy at the 1988 Winter Paralympics and he won the bronze medal at the Downhill B2 event.

References

External links
 

Living people
Place of birth missing (living people)
Paralympic alpine skiers of Italy
Alpine skiers at the 1988 Winter Paralympics
Medalists at the 1988 Winter Paralympics
Paralympic bronze medalists for Italy
Paralympic medalists in alpine skiing
20th-century Italian people
1962 births